Nawab Ahmad Ali Khan Bahadur (12 October 1787 – 5 July 1840) was Nawab of Rampur from 1794 to 1840, succeeding his brother Ghulam Muhammad Khan Bahadur. The only son of Muhammad Ali Khan Bahadur, Ahmad Ali was made Nawab following the deposition of his uncle Ghulam Muhammad by the British East India Company and the Nawab of Awadh. Ahmad Ali ruled for 46 years, although he reigned from 1794 to 1811 under a regency. He transformed the cultural fabric of Rampur and started a tradition of cultural involvement that has been maintained by his successors to the present day. In 1801, Rampur became a vassal of the HEIC following the cession of Rohilkand by the Nawab of Awadh. Ahmad Ali died on 5 July 1840, aged 52. As his only son had died young, he was succeeded as Nawab by his cousin, Muhammad Said Khan Bahadur.

Ahmad Ali Khan is credited with developing the dog breed known as Rampur Hound. He bred these dogs by combining the ferocious Tāzī Afghan dogs with the English Greyhound, more obedient but less resistant to the harsher local weather. The Nawab gave the name 'Rampur Hound' to the dogs he bred.

Cultural Depictions

References

Nawabs of Rampur
Nawabs of India
Indian Shia Muslims
1787 births

1840 deaths